A brewer is a person or business that makes beer by brewing.

Brewer may also refer to:

Brewer (surname), a disambiguation page that lists people with the surname Brewer
Brewer, Maine, a city in southern Penobscot County, Maine, United States, near the city of Bangor
Milwaukee Brewers, a major league baseball team based in Milwaukee, Wisconsin
Bernie Brewer, the mascot of the Milwaukee Brewers
Arizona League Brewers, an affiliated minor league team in Phoenix, Arizona
Helena Brewers, an affiliated minor league team in Helena, Montana
Brewer (John Updike), a fictional city in the "Rabbit" novels by John Updike
Brewer's Dictionary of Phrase and Fable, a reference work containing definitions and explanations of many famous phrases, allusions and figures
C. Brewer & Co., a large Hawaiian agricultural company founded in 1826 and based in Honolulu
Brewer Spectrophotometer, a ground-based spectrophotometer measuring ozone column, sulfur dioxide column, UV radiation and the aerosol optical depth
 Brewer Street, London, England
 Brewer Street, Oxford, England
Yakovlev Yak-28, a combat aircraft used by the Soviet Union and (when configured as a bomber) assigned the NATO reporting name Brewer

See also 
 Brasseur
 Breuer
 Brouwer
 Brauer
 Brauner
 Brenner (disambiguation)
 Brewers (disambiguation)
 Brunner (disambiguation)
 Bronner
 Justice Brewer (disambiguation)